This article lists all-time records achieved in the AAU tourney and the local leagues in a few statistical categories. The tournaments organized by the AAU started in 1897 and until the late 1940s included college teams, athletic clubs and company teams. Gale Bishop holds the record for most points scored having netted 62 in the second round of the 1945 tournament in Denver.

Former NBA players such as LeRoy Ellis, Tim Hardaway and Artis Gilmore have played in the masters tournaments, and set several records.

AAU Scoring records

AAU tournaments

AAU Exhibition Games

U.S. Olympic Games Fund Benefit Game (AAU sanctioned)

National A.A.U. Masters (Over-40 Division)

National A.A.U. Masters (Over-45 Division)

American Basketball League (AAU) scoring record

National Industrial Basketball League (AAU) scoring records

Players with most AAU championships
 6
"Shorty" Carpenter
 5
Martin Nash
 4
Jimmy McNatt, Omar Browning, John W. Pariseau, Frank McCabe, Marc Freiberger,  Forrest DeBernardi, Willie Rothman, Fred Pralle
 3
Jay Triano, Bob Kurland,  Ron Bontemps,  Bob Gruenig, Harold Hewitt, John Gibbons, Jack McCracken, Gerald Tucker, Todd Burton

International trophies won by AAU teams
 FIBA Intercontinental Cup: 1967, 1968, 1969 by Akron Wingfoots
 Merlion Cup (basketball): 1988 by Brewster Heights Packing

References

Amateur Athletic Union
Basketball in the United States
American records
Basketball statistics